Colin Edwin Brown (12 October 1878 – 25 June 1936) played first-class cricket for Somerset in 1902 and 1905. He was born at North Curry, Taunton, Somerset and died at Whitby, North Yorkshire.

Brown was a lower-order batsman and an occasional bowler. It is not known whether he batted left- or right-handed or what his bowling style was. He appeared in one match for Somerset in 1902 with little success, and returned for seven further games in 1905. His only batting success came in the match against Lancashire in 1905, when he made 53 in the second innings, more than double his second highest career score; in this match, the Lancashire bowler Walter Brearley took 17 Somerset wickets, including four wickets in four balls – the last two of the first innings and the first two of the second innings. Brown was dismissed by Brearley in both innings, and Somerset lost the game by an innings and 160 runs inside two days.

References

1878 births
1936 deaths
English cricketers
Somerset cricketers